Swan Dive is an American bossa nova/pop musical duo composed of Bill DeMain and Molly Felder. Founded in 1995, Swan Dive is best known for its album Circle, released in 1998. 

Swan Dive has appeared on Late Night with Conan O'Brien, and opened shows for Norah Jones, Over the Rhine and Sixpence None the Richer, and their music has been heard on television shows such as Felicity, The L Word and Unfabulous. The group has attracted fans both on the local scene and abroad, particularly Japan, Korea and Thailand, where they've earned four Top 10 singles along with television appearances and multi-city tours. In early 2002, Swan Dive's Circle won in The 1st Annual Independent Music Awards for Pop Song.

Bill DeMain is a Grammy-nominated writer (The Look of Love: The Burt Bacharach Collection) and freelance journalist, whose songs have been recorded by Teddy Thompson & Kelly Jones, Marshall Crenshaw, Jill Sobule, Amy Rigby, Marti Jones and others. Molly Felder has also sung jingles on a number of national advertising campaigns including Pepsi, Michelob and Chevrolet, and has backed well-known artists including Amy Grant, Michael McDonald and Ricky Skaggs.

Discography

Main albums

 Wintergreen (1997)
 You're Beautiful (1997)
 Circle (1998)
 Swan Dive (2000)
 June (2001)
 Words You Whisper (2002)
 William & Marlys (2004)
 Popcorn & a Mama Who Loves Me Too (2005)
 Until (2007)
 Mayfair (2009)
 Soundtrack to Me and You (2014)
 Transatlantic Romantic - Bill DeMain (2017)

Compilations
 Groovy Tuesday/Rarities (2004)
 You're Beautiful/Words You Whisper (2004)
 June/Better to Fly (2008)
 Best Of and Besides (2009)

Singles & EPs
 Circle (1998)
 Electronic (2000)
"Extended Stay" (2011) (Bill DeMain solo EP)
"Vaudeville EP" (2021) (Bill DeMain solo EP)

Music videos
In 2007, Swan Dive released the music videos "Tender Love" directed by Kip Kubin and "Until" (the carrier single of the album with the same title), starring acclaimed Filipino actress and noted celebrity, Angel Aquino, directed by Filipino independent filmmaker Elvert Bañares.

External links
 Official Swan Dive Website
 Puremusic feature on Swan Dive
 Review of Swan Dive's Until
 Interview with Swan Dive's Bill DeMain

American musical duos
American pop music groups
Independent Music Awards winners
Musical groups established in 1995